The Liberty Bend Bridge is the common name for the two continuous truss bridges on Route 291 over the Missouri River in Sugar Creek, Missouri in the Kansas City metropolitan area.

Although the bridges cross over the Missouri River, they do not cross the county line.  When the Missouri River was rerouted in 1949, it cut across the northern part of Jackson County, Missouri. This left part of the county north of the river, which is known as River Bend. The original Liberty Bend Bridge was located about two miles to the north, which then crossed over into Clay County, Missouri.

The main span length is 460.1 feet and the total length is 1,883.3 feet.  Vertical clearance is 16.5 feet.

History
The original Liberty Bend Bridge was built in 1927 and was dismantled in 1973. After the new river channel was cut and the new bridge built over it in 1949, the old bridge continued to carry traffic from the bottoms up to Arsenal Hill, spanning the old riverbed and also crossing the railroad tracks. The then 291, now Southview Dr, continued north. In the early 1970s, the new four-lane divided 291 was built along the east side of the old highway, and the new Independence-Liberty Bridge (the pair of bridges now carrying 291 across the railroad) was built alongside the old Liberty Bend Bridge. It was then, that the old bridge was torn down.

Northbound

The northbound bridge was built 1949 (with the rerouting, and new channel of the Missouri River) and rehabilitated 1986.  With the completion of the new bridge (southbound), all traffic was moved over to the new span. Work immediately began on the northbound bridge during the years 2001–05. The bridge was rehabilitated once again, and deck was completely removed and replaced. The northbound bridge reopened in 2005.
The northbound deck is 23.9 feet wide.

Southbound
The southbound bridge was started in 1996, completed and opened in 2001 with a deck width of 40 feet.

July 2009 Emergency Closure
On July 7, 2009, a routine inspection revealed serious problems with the northbound bridge. MoDOT immediately closed the span indefinitely. In a few days a temporary (permanent/paved) crossover was constructed, allowing the rerouting of northbound traffic to share the southbound bridge while repairs were completed. The span opened for traffic in September 2009.

See also
List of crossings of the Missouri River

References

Bridgehunter.com profile

Bridges in Kansas City, Missouri
Bridges completed in 1949
Bridges completed in 2001
Buildings and structures in Clay County, Missouri
Buildings and structures in Jackson County, Missouri
Road bridges in Missouri
U.S. Route 71
Steel bridges in the United States